Estiar (also Romanized as Estīār and Astīār; also known as Estiaré Mavazé Khan and Istiar) is a village in Mavazekhan-e Sharqi Rural District, Khvajeh District, Heris County, East Azerbaijan Province, Iran. At the 2006 census, its population was 266, in 55 families.

References 

Populated places in Heris County